Four ships of the Royal Navy have been named HMS Magnificent.
  was a 74-gun third rate launched in 1766 and wrecked in 1804.
  was a 74-gun third rate launched in 1806. She was used as a hospital ship from 1825 and was sold in 1843.
  was a  launched in 1894. She was used as a storeship from 1918 and was sold in 1921.
 HMS Magnificent was a  launched in 1944, loaned to the Royal Canadian Navy upon completion in 1948, returned in 1957, and scrapped in 1965.

Royal Navy ship names